Zhao Ziyue ("Confucius-saith Zhao") is a 1927 Chinese-language novel by Lao She. His second novel, like the first, The Philosophy of Old Zhang, the story is set among students in Beijing following the May Fourth Incident. However,the tone of the book is less sympathetic to students, showing the pretentiously named title character and his circle as unprincipled and shallow rather than as victims.

References

Novels by Lao She
1927 novels